Edmonson County is a county located in the south central portion of the U.S. state of Kentucky. As of the 2020 census, the population was 12,126. Its county seat is Brownsville. The county was formed in 1825 and named for Captain John "Jack" Edmonson (1764–1813), who was killed at the Battle of Frenchtown during the War of 1812. This is a dry county where the sale of alcohol is prohibited. Edmonson County is included in the Bowling Green, Kentucky Metropolitan Statistical Area.

History
Edmonson County was established on January 12, 1825, from land given by Grayson, Hart and Warren counties. A courthouse built in 1873 replaced a former structure rendered unfit when its floor collapsed.

Geography

Adjacent counties
 Grayson County  (north)
 Hart County  (east)
 Barren County  (southeast)
 Warren County  (southwest)
 Butler County  (west)

National protected area
 Mammoth Cave National Park

Demographics

As of the census of 2000, there were 11,644 people, 4,648 households, and 3,462 families residing in the county. The racial makeup of the county was 98.39% White, 0.58% Black or African American, 0.44% Native American, 0.07% Asian, 0.06% from other races, and 0.46% from two or more races.  0.56% of the population were Hispanic or Latino of any race.

There were 4,648 households, out of which 31.80% had children under the age of 18 living with them, 62.20% were married couples living together, 8.90% had a female householder with no husband present, and 25.50% were non-families. 22.40% of all households were made up of individuals, and 9.60% had someone living alone who was 65 years of age or older.  The average household size was 2.47 and the average family size was 2.88.

In the county, the population was spread out, with 23.60% under the age of 18, 9.00% from 18 to 24, 27.80% from 25 to 44, 25.30% from 45 to 64, and 14.40% who were 65 years of age or older.  The median age was 38 years. For every 100 males there were 92.50 females.  For every 100 males age 18 and over, there were 89.33 females.

The median income for a household in the county was $25,413, and the median income for a family was $31,843. Males had a median income of $26,770 versus $17,158 for females. The per capita income for the county was $14,480.  About 14.20% of families and 18.40% of the population were below the poverty line, including 25.50% of those under age 18 and 21.00% of those age 65 or over.

Politics

Education

There are currently five public schools operating as part of the Edmonson County School System. They are Kyrock Elementary (in the Kyrock community in northern Edmonson County), South Edmonson Elementary (near the Chalybeate community in southern Edmonson County), the Edmonson County Fifth/Sixth Grade Center, Edmonson County Middle School, and Edmonson County High School (all in Brownsville).

Transportation

There are two main routes that form the major transportation corridors through Edmonson County.

KY 70 is the primary west to east route, traversing the width of the county.

KY 259 enters Edmonson County at the border with Grayson County, near the town of Bee Spring. The highway continues on, bridging the Green River (the only bridge over the river in Edmonson County), before intersecting with KY 101. KY 259 then branches off in a southeastern direction while KY 101 continues as the main north–south route through the county, exiting into Warren County just south of the community of Chalybeate.

Additionally, KY 185 is a north–south route connecting Bowling Green with points in the western part of the county and points north into Grayson County. I-65 passes through the southeastern tip of the county, but has no interchanges allowing access to the freeway within the county. I-65 parallels the older US 31W, which runs through a small southeastern portion of the county.

Attractions

The biggest tourist attraction in Edmonson County is Mammoth Cave National Park, which usually draws almost 2 million visitors a year. The park includes in its area roughly a fourth of the county.

Located mostly in the northern part of Edmonson County, the Nolin Lake area was incorporated as a Kentucky State Park in 2001 and offers fishing and other recreational opportunities.

Media

Print media

Edmonson County is served by a weekly newspaper, the Edmonson News. The paper is sometimes referred to by its nickname, "the Gimlet", and carries the slogan "It Bores In". The paper has a circulation number of 3,704.

Radio and television
Edmonson County is part of the Bowling Green radio and television markets, and is served mainly by that city's radio and TV outlets. Mediacom is the local cable provider serving the county.  

The unincorporated community of Wingfield, in southwestern Edmonson County, is home to the transmitting tower of adult hits-formatted radio station WKLX 100.7 Sam FM (officially licensed in Brownsville) and low-powered television station WCZU-LD, although both outlets operate outside of Edmonson County.

Online blogs
Additionally, Edmonson County is also served by an online news website, Edmonson Voice. It is a multimedia platform that operates as a combination of an online newspaper, a streaming broadcaster, and video report provider. The company serves as the main media outlet in the county with a weekly readership of over 23,000.

Edmonson County on national television
On March 6, 2007, MTV wrote an article titled "Who's Joining The Army" in which they stated Edmonson County has the highest Army enlistment rate of any county in the United States.

The Edmonson County Sheriff's Department has been featured on A&E Television's Live PD.

Movies filmed in Edmonson County
Edmonson County was one of two main locations where two faith-based films, The Prayer Box and Christmas Manger, were filmed in 2017 and 2018, respectively.

Video archive
Volunteers have digitized and created a repository of video related to Edmonson County High School on YouTube.  The archive contains a variety of media, including graduation ceremonies, proms, and athletic events.

Local Events
 Edmonson County Lions Club Fair - early September (including a parade that takes place in downtown Brownsville on the second Friday of September), one of the longest-running county fairs in the state.
 Nolin Fest (July or August) - at Nolin Lake State Park, organized by the Friends of Nolin Lake.
 Annual Saddle Club Horse Show - Edmonson County Fairgrounds
 Freedom Fest (late June) at the Chalybeate Sports Complex 
Source: Edmonson County Tourism Commission

Communities

City
 Brownsville (county seat)

Unincorporated communities

 Asphalt
 Bee Spring
 Big Reedy
 Cedar Spring
 Chalybeate Springs
 Huff
 Lincoln
 Lindseyville
 Mammoth Cave
 Pig
 Rhoda
 Rocky Hill
 Roundhill (partly in Butler County)
 Sunfish
 Sweeden
 Windyville
 Wingfield

Ghost towns
Joppa
Kyrock

Notable residents
 Joe Blanton, Major League Baseball pitcher, was born in Nashville, Tennessee, but spent most of his childhood and young adult life in Edmonson County on Otter Gap Road.
 Ben Helson, a guitarist for Dierks Bentley, is a native of the Chalybeate community.

See also

 Edmonson County High School
 Mammoth Cave National Park
 National Register of Historic Places listings in Edmonson County, Kentucky

References

External links
 Edmonson County official website
 Edmonson County Schools website
 Edmonson County Tourist Commission 
 Civil War in Edmonson County
 The Kentucky Highlands Project
 Mammoth Cave NPS Site
 Nolin Lake State Park Site 

 
Kentucky counties
Bowling Green metropolitan area, Kentucky
Counties of Appalachia
1825 establishments in Kentucky
Populated places established in 1825